Riding High is the fourth album by the Canadian rock band Chilliwack, released in Canada in April 1974.  It was the band's first album with new guitarist/keyboardist Howard Froese, and contained the top-10 (in Canada) hit "Crazy Talk", which was co-produced by Terry Jacks of Poppy Family fame.  In Canada, the album was released on Jacks' label Goldfish Records; in the U.S., it was not released until 1975 on Sire Records, where it was retitled Chilliwack (their third U.S. release to bear that title).

Track listing
"Come On Over" (Turney, Henderson) (4:35)
"Crazy Talk" (Henderson) (5:25)
"There's Something I Like About That" (Turney, Henderson) (2:50)
"Makin' Time" (Turney, Henderson) (5:40)
"Riding High" (Turney, Henderson) (5:30)
"Time Don't Mean a Thing to Ya" (Henderson) (3:00)
"Far Side of the Sun (Suite)" (Turney, Henderson, Miller, Froese) (8:30)
 "Far Side Of The Sun"
 "Secrets"
 "Drifting"

Singles
 "There Is Something I Like About That" (Turney, Henderson) (2:28)
Single Remix
Mono
Goldfish single GS 105
"Crazy Talk" (Henderson) (2:51)
Single Remix
Mono
Goldfish single GS 110
"In and Out" (Turney, Henderson, Miller, Froese) (2:39)
B-Side of "Crazy Talk" and "There Is Something I Like About That" 7" Singles
Mono
Produced by Terry Jacks for Poppy Family prod.
"Come On Over" (Turney, Henderson) (3:12)
Single Remix
Stereo
Goldfish single GS 114
 "Riding High" (Turney, Henderson) (3:09)
 Single Remix
 Mono / Stereo
 Produced by Craig Leon
 Casino single C7 110
 Promotional release issued after the Rockerbox album.

Personnel
Chilliwack
Bill Henderson - guitar, synthesizer, lead vocals
Glenn Miller - bass
Ross Turney - drums, percussion
Howard Froese - guitar, keyboards, harmony vocals

Production
Mike Flicker (Tracks 1,4,5,6,7)
Terry Jacks (Tracks 2 & 3) 

Engineers: Mike Flicker and Rolf Hennemann
Mastering: Robert Ludwig, Sterling Sound, New York
Management: Jim Herringer, Unity Artist Management, Inc., Vancouver

1974 albums
Chilliwack (band) albums
Sire Records albums
Albums produced by Mike Flicker